Charles W. Morse (born October 11, 1960), known as Chuck Morse, is an American politician who served as president of the New Hampshire Senate and was once acting governor of New Hampshire. Morse has represented New Hampshire's 22nd State Senate district since 2010, having previously held the same office from 2002-2006.

In 2022, Morse was a Republican candidate for the U.S. Senate in New Hampshire, placing second in the primary behind Donald Bolduc.

Biography
Morse lives with his wife, Susan, and their daughter in Salem, New Hampshire. Morse received his bachelor's degree in business from Plymouth State University. He is the owner of Freshwater Farms, a landscaping business and garden center in southern New Hampshire.

Political career

State legislature
Morse served in the New Hampshire House of Representatives from 1998 through 2002. He served in the New Hampshire Senate from 2002 through 2006 and led the Senate Finance Committee. He ran for the Executive Council of New Hampshire in 2006, but lost the election to  state Senator Beverly Hollingworth. He returned to the New Hampshire Senate in 2010 by being elected in the 22nd district that fall. He was chosen as the president of the Senate, succeeding Peter Bragdon, in 2013. Morse served on the Finance Committee and was responsible for crafting the state budget.

Morse was re-elected to his Senate seat in 2018, but the Republicans were in the minority by a margin of 14–10 in 2019–2020. The ten newly elected Republican members of the state senate chose Morse as their caucus leader shortly after the election. His successor as president was Democratic state senator Donna Soucy.

Morse was re-elected to his Senate seat in 2020 and the Republicans regained the majority by a margin of 14-10. The 14 newly elected Republican members of the state senate chose Morse as their candidate for senate president shortly after the election.

Governor of New Hampshire

In 2017, Morse served as acting governor of New Hampshire for two days, from when Maggie Hassan resigned as governor in order to join the United States Senate on January 3, 2017, until Chris Sununu's inauguration on January 5, 2017.

Morse was ceremonially introduced as governor before the legislature and State Senator Sharon Carson briefly assumed the role of Senate President during legislative proceedings. Morse's short stint as governor largely consisted of ceremonial activities in the governor's chamber, including signing proclamations and taking photos with members from his home district.

U.S. Senate campaign

In 2022, Morse announced he would not seek re-election to the New Hampshire Senate and would instead seek the Republican nomination for United States Senate in the 2022 United States Senate election in New Hampshire. It had been widely anticipated that Morse would seek a full term as Governor of New Hampshire in the 2022 election, however incumbent Republican Chris Sununu opted to seek reelection, causing Morse to shift course toward a U.S. Senate run.

Morse placed second in the primary, narrowly behind Donald Bolduc, and conceded the day after the primary.

Political positions

Economic
As a state senator, Morse has opposed a broad-based state sales or income tax, has advanced legislation aimed at reducing property taxes, and has focused on eliminating other state taxes, particularly the interest and dividends tax, which the newest state budget will phase out.

Immigration
As a candidate for U.S. Senate, Morse has highlighted border security as a priority if elected, suggesting current U.S. policy related to border security is responsible for the presence of drugs, including fentanyl, in the state.

Environment
As a state senator, Morse has referenced his landscaping and gardening business as influencing his understanding of environmental issues. Morse has voted against protection for wetlands, solar energy and net-metering due to his opposition to government regulation.

Abortion
In 2017, Morse voted for SB66 which authorized murder charges for an individual who causes the death of a fetus. Morse helped pass New Hampshire's 24-week late-term abortion ban and has opposed Roe v. Wade, advocating for states to determine abortion laws. He has consistently voted against measures creating buffer zones around abortion clinics.

References

External links
 
 
 
 Electoral history

|-

|-

|-

|-

|-

|-

1960 births
21st-century American politicians
Candidates in the 2022 United States Senate elections
Republican Party governors of New Hampshire
Living people
Republican Party members of the New Hampshire House of Representatives
Republican Party New Hampshire state senators
People from Salem, New Hampshire
Plymouth State University alumni
Presidents of the New Hampshire Senate